

Northern Transvaal results in the 1988 Currie cup

Statistics

1988 Currie cup log position

1988 - 1988 results summary (including play off matches)

Northern Transvaal
1988